Elohor Godswill Epokoli (born 14 May 1995) is a Nigerian professional footballer who plays for Cypriot First Division club Apollon Limassol. Mainly a right back, he can also play as a central defender.

Playing career
Ekpolo moved with his family to Spain from Nigeria in 2002, and settled in Tarragona. He came through the youth team at FC Barcelona, and played for the reserve team and captained the under-21 team, before he was released in June 2016. 

After a trial at Wolverhampton Wanderers in July 2016, he signed with English League One side Fleetwood Town on a contract of undisclosed length in November. He scored his first goal for Fleetwood in an EFL Trophy tie against Leicester City Under-23s on 29 August 2017.

Having been replaced at right-back by Everton loanee Gethin Jones, Ekpolo returned to Spain on 26 January 2018 and  signed for Mérida AD of Segunda División B.

On 29 June 2018, Ekpolo signed a six-month  deal with Swedish Allsvenskan side BK Häcken, and on 12 October it was extended to the end of 2021.

Statistics

Club

Honours
Barcelona
UEFA Youth League: 2013–14

References

1995 births
Living people
Sportspeople from Benin City
Nigerian footballers
Nigeria youth international footballers
Association football fullbacks
Nigerian expatriate footballers
Nigerian emigrants to Spain
FC Barcelona Atlètic players
Expatriate footballers in England
Fleetwood Town F.C. players
Mérida AD players
BK Häcken players
IFK Norrköping players
English Football League players
Allsvenskan players
Nigerian expatriate sportspeople in England
Naturalised citizens of Spain
Sportspeople from Tarragona
Footballers from Catalonia
Spanish footballers
FC Barcelona players
Spanish sportspeople of African descent
Spanish people of Nigerian descent
Sportspeople of Nigerian descent